Vertigo pseudosubstriata is a species of minute, air-breathing land snail, a terrestrial pulmonate gastropod mollusc or micromollusk in the family Vertiginidae, the whorl snails.

Distribution 
Vertigo pseudosubstriata was first identified as a Pleistocene fossil in the Weichselian loess of Dolní Věstonice (Moravia, Czech Republic). Further Pleistocene evidence followed in Central Europe.

The first indications of recent occurrences of the species in the Tien Shan were submitted by Matěkin. Uvalieva (1967) discovered the species anew in the Southern Altai Mountains and initially described it as Vertigo laevis (synonym). In recent times to date, this species has been found in the Tien Shan, Altai Mountains, Pamir Mountains and Himalayas where it is relatively widespread in their alpine altitudes.

The recent distribution of Vertigo pseudosubstriata includes:
 Pakistan
 Kazakhstan

Shell description 
The shape of the shell is cylindrical-ovate.

The width of the shell is 1.2 mm; the height of the shell is 2.1-2.2 mm.

References
This article incorporates CC-BY-3.0 text from the reference

External links
 Uvalieva, K.K. (1967). New species of terrestrial mollusks from the Southern Altay. Trudy Zoologicheskogo Instituta AN SSSR. 42: 213-220 (in Russian)
 Meng, S., Vasyliev, P., Khoptynets, I., Tkach, V. & Maier, A. (2021). On the present habitats and ecology of Vertigo pseudosubstriata Ložek, 1954 (Mollusca, Gastropoda, Vertiginidea) in Central Asia and its distribution history in Central and Eastern Europe. Journal of Quaternary Science
 Pokryszko, B. M., Auffenberg, K., Hlaváč, J. Č. & Naggs, F. (2009). Pupilloidea of Pakistan (Gastropoda: Pulmonata): Truncatellininae, Vertigininae, Gastrocoptinae, Pupillinae (In Part). Annales Zoologici. 59(4): 423-458
 Schileyko, A. A. & Rymzhanov, T. S. (2013). Fauna of land mollusks (Gastropoda, Pulmonata Terrestria) of Kazakhstan and adjacent territories. Moscow-Almaty: KMK Scientific Press. 389 pp

Vertigo (gastropod)
Gastropods described in 1954
Molluscs of Pakistan